Wongabel is a rural locality in the Tablelands Region, Queensland, Australia. In the  Wongabel had a population of 221 people.

History 
The locality takes its name from the Wongabel railway station, named on 20 October 1910 by the Queensland Railway Department. It is an Aboriginal word meaning wood pigeon.

Herberton Range Provisional School opened in 1909 and closed in 1910. It was a tent school to provide schooling for the children of railway workers living in railway camps during the construction of the railway through the Herberton Range.

In World War II as part of the Atherton Project, tent encampments were established by the Australian Army (6th and 7th Divisions) near Wongabel, Wondecla and Ravenshoe.

In the  Wongabel had a population of 221 people.

References 

Tablelands Region
Localities in Queensland